Mike McLean (born January 6, 1986) is a Canadian former professional ice hockey player. He last played for the Coventry Blaze in the Elite Ice Hockey League (EIHL).

Playing career
On August 14, 2008, the Florida Everblades traded McLean to the Dayton Bombers (along with Steve Czech, Jarret Lukin, and future considerations), in exchange for Yannick Tifu.

On August 31, 2010, the Quad City Mallards signed McLean to a try-out agreement. Making the team, McLean went on to score 51 points in 55 games for the  Central Hockey League team, and represented the Mallards at the 2011 Central Hockey League All-Star Game.

Career statistics

Awards and honours

References

External links

1986 births
Living people
Canadian ice hockey players
Cincinnati Cyclones (ECHL) players
Coventry Blaze players
Dayton Bombers players
Elmira Jackals (ECHL) players
Florida Everblades players
Guelph Storm players
Gwinnett Gladiators players
Ice hockey people from Ontario
Kalamazoo Wings (UHL) players
Lake Erie Monsters players
Milwaukee Admirals players
Oshawa Generals players
Quad City Mallards (CHL) players
Sportspeople from Oshawa
Canadian expatriate ice hockey players in England
Canadian expatriate ice hockey players in the United States